Laurens is a French surname. Notable people with the surname include:

 André du Laurens (1558–1609), French doctor and gerontologist, and physician to King Henry IV of France
 Camille Laurens (born 1957), French writer
 Guillemette Laurens (born 1957), French opera singer
 Henri Laurens (1885-1954), French sculptor and illustrator
 Henry Laurens (1724-1792), American political leader and diplomat
 Henry Laurens (scholar) (born 1954), French historian specialising in the Arab-Muslim world
 Henri Joseph Du Laurens (1719-1793), French novelist
 Jean-Joseph Bonaventure Laurens (1801-1890), French painter and musician
 Jean-Paul Laurens (1838-1921), French painter and sculptor
 John Laurens (1754-1782), American soldier and statesman
 Jonathan Laurens (born 1977), Venezuelan football striker
 Jules Laurens (1825-1901), French artist
 Julien Laurens (born 1980), French journalist
 Leo Laurens, Belgian retired darts player
 Rose Laurens (1953–2018), French singer-songwriter
 Simon Laurens (born 1967), British para-equestrian
 Stephanie Laurens (born 1953), Australian author
 Suzanne Laurens, French sculptor

French-language surnames